Hanns Kräly (January 16, 1884 – November 11, 1950), credited in the United States as Hans Kraly, was a German actor and screenwriter. His main collaborations were with director Ernst Lubitsch, and they worked together on 30 films between 1915 and 1929. Kräly is also notable for his comedy play Kohlhiesel's Daughters which has been turned into films on a number of occasions.

Kräly was nominated for three Academy Awards for writing. He won the award for Best Writing with The Patriot in 1930. He was also nominated for the adapted screenplay of The Last of Mrs. Cheyney, also in 1930, and for Original Screenplay of One Hundred Men and a Girl in 1937. Additional screenwriting credits include Private Lives and Just a Gigolo, both released in 1931.

Selected filmography

Screenwriter
 The Firm Gets Married (1914)
 Shoe Palace Pinkus (1916)
 Carmen (1918)
 Meyer from Berlin (1919)
 The Ballet Girl (1918)
 Intoxication (1919)
 My Wife, the Movie Star (1919)
 A Drive into the Blue (1919)
 Countess Doddy (1919)
 The Housing Shortage (1920)
 Romeo and Juliet in the Snow (1920)
 Monika Vogelsang (1920)
 Hundemamachen (1920)
 The Grand Babylon Hotel (1920)
 The Flame (1923)
 Paradise in the Snow (1923)
 La Boheme (1923)
 Comedians of Life (1924)
 Three Women (1924)
 Her Sister from Paris (1925)
 Betrayal (1929)
 Eternal Love (1929)

External links

1884 births
1950 deaths
German male silent film actors
German male screenwriters
20th-century German male actors
Male actors from Hamburg
Best Adapted Screenplay Academy Award winners
German male writers
Film people from Hamburg
20th-century German screenwriters
German emigrants to the United States